"Duende" is the second single from Delerium's album Karma featuring singer Camille Henderson. The single wasn't included on Delerium's Best Of collection.

The chants in the song were sampled from the album Heart of the Forest performed by The Baka Forest Pygmies and from the CD Ritual Music of the Kayapo-Xirin, Brazil.

Remixes were done by Emily and Dreamlogic.

A video of the song was made and directed by William Morrison.

Track listing
 Cd-Maxi - 1997
 "Duende (Album Mix - Edit Version) " - 3:59
 "Duende (Bleak Desolation Mix) " - 7:54
 "Duende (Spiritual Collapse Mix)" - 8:24

 Vinyl - 1997
 "Duende (Bleak Desolation Mix) " - 7:54
 "Duende (Bleak Desolation Dub) " - 6:45
 "Duende (Spiritual Collapse Mix)" - 8:24
 "Duende (Album Mix - Edit Version) " - 3:59

References

Delerium songs
1997 songs
Songs written by Bill Leeb
Songs written by Rhys Fulber
Nettwerk Records singles